What's Your Hurry? is a 1920 American silent drama film produced by Famous Players-Lasky and distributed by Paramount Pictures. It was directed by Sam Wood and stars Wallace Reid and Lois Wilson.

Plot
As described in a film magazine, to win the favor of his sweetheart's father "Old Pat" MacMurran (Ogle), race car driver Dusty Rhoades (Reid) forsakes the speedway in determination to put over effective publicity for the father's product, Pakro motor trucks. A prospective order from Cabrillo Irrigation Company is an incentive to his effort. MacMurran fumbles his publicity plan to bring a giant Christmas tree down from the mountains for the children of Los Angeles on a Pakro truck and goes soberly to the Cabrillo Valley to spend the holiday. Inability to get supplies to builders of the valley dam over the storm-driven roads threatens the lives and homes of valley residents. The day is saved by a truck driven by Dusty carrying the necessary supplies. There is a certainty of a wife for Dusty in Virginia MacMurran (Wilson) and a job at Pakro as the film ends.

Cast
Wallace Reid as Dusty Rhoades
Lois Wilson as Virginia MacMurran
Charles Ogle as Patrick MacMurran
Clarence Burton as Brenton Harding
Ernest Butterworth as The Office Boy

unbilled
Ernest Joy
Jack Young

Preservation
A copy of What's Your Hurry? is maintained at Gosfilmofond in Moscow.

See also
Wallace Reid filmography

References

External links

Period advertisement showing Lois and Wally

1920 films
Films directed by Sam Wood
American silent feature films
Paramount Pictures films
1920 drama films
Silent American drama films
American black-and-white films
1920s American films